Kino Lorber is an international film distribution company based in New York City. Founded in 1977, it was originally known as Kino International until it was acquired by and merged into Lorber HT Digital in 2009. It specializes in art house films, such as documentary films, classic films from earlier periods in the history of cinema, and world cinema. In addition to theatrical distribution, Kino Lorber releases films in the home entertainment market and has its own streaming services for its digital library.

History

1977–2008; Founding as Kino International 
Kino Lorber was founded as Kino International in 1977 by Bill Pence. It was then purchased by Donald Krim who at the time worked for United Artists as the head of the nontheatrical department. It began by importing and releasing international films that may have not otherwise reached the market in the United States. One of the first films imported under Krim was Ballad of Orin. In 1977, the company acquired rights to the Janus film collection, which became the foundation for its international library of films. 

Kino International was responsible for the theatrical release of films by Charlie Chaplin beginning in 1977. The Chaplin films became the foundation of a silent film collection for Kino International including the 1927 sci-fi film Metropolis. 

By 1989, American classics accounted for 80 percent of the company's distributions, with the other 20 percent made up of international films.

2009–present; Merger with Lorber HT Digital 
In 2009, Kino International was acquired by Lorber HT Digital to form Kino Lorber.

Kino Lorber launched its "Kino Lorber Studio Classics" line of films in 2014. Its licensing deal with MGM allowed them access to MGM's library of remastered and high-definition films. It released approximately 40 films by the end of 2014, including the Billy Wilder films Witness for the Prosecution and The Private Life of Sherlock Holmes. 

In 2017, Kino Lorber entered into a partnership with Zeitgeist Films to co-acquire films for theatrical release and taking over home entertainment distribution of their library.

In 2019, Kino Lorber launched a digital streaming service known as "Kino Now." Described as an "arthouse iTunes," it allows the purchase and rentals of films in its distribution library. 

During the COVID-19 pandemic lock-downs in 2020, Kino Lorber launched an online distribution service to stream new films in partnership with closed theaters. Known as "Kino Marquee," the service was seen as a way to help closed theaters generate revenue during the pandemic, splitting revenue equally with participating cinemas.  

In 2021, Kino Lorber launched "Kino Cult," a free ad-supported channel for genre films. It also entered into a distribution and acquisition agreement with Milestone Films, a New York-based film company known for restoring and distribution of American classic films.

Business model 
Kino Lorber has historically been known as a distributor of American classics and international films. When founded in 1977, American classics was 100 percent of its distribution, moving to 80/20 with international films by 1989.

Filmography 
By 2023, Kino Lorber had over 4,000 titles in its curated library, including: 

Neptune Frost (2022)
 Ahed's Knee (2022)
 Test Pattern (2021)
Diabolik (2021)
 Preparations to be Together for an Unknown Period of Time (2020)
 Capital in the Twenty-First Century (2020)
 Babylon (2019)
 Stretch (2014)
 Farewell Herr Schwarz (2014)
 The Wiggles series (2013-2018)
 Winnebago Man (2010)
 Loren Cass (2009)
 Dogtooth (2009)
 Ajami (2009)
 Harvard Beats Yale 29-29 (2008)
 Ballast (2008)
 Love Comes Lately (2007)
 Crossing the Line (2006) 
 Lady Chatterley (2006)
 Slippin': Ten Years with the Bloods (2005)
 Swept Away (2002)
 Kippur (2000)
 Fallen Angels (Re-release 2010)
 The Cherry Orchard (1999)
 Funny Games (1997)
 Happy Together (1997)
 Saint Clara (1996)
 The Wonderful, Horrible Life of Leni Riefenstahl (1993)
 Roxanne (1987)
 Modern Girls (1986)
 Scene of the Crime (1986)
 Sacred Ground (1983)
 The Sea Wolves (1980)
 Avalanche Express (1979)
 Fast Charlie... the Moonbeam Rider (1979)
 S.O.S. Titanic (1979)
 David (1979)
 Across the Great Divide (1976)
 Swept Away (1974)
 Charley Varrick (1973)
 Day for Night (1973)
 Dad's Army (1971)
 Brother John (1971)
 Putney Swope (1969)
 Rage (1966)
 Kaleidoscope (1966)
 Andrei Rublev (1966)
 4 for Texas (1963)
 One, Two, Three (1961)
 Les Bonnes Femmes (1960)
 Last of the Comanches (1953)
 M (1951)
 The Reckless Moment (1949)
 The Dark Past (1948)
 Gunfighters (1947)
 Conflict (1945)
 Titanic (1943)
 Munchhausen (1943)
 Reefer Madness (1936)
 The Struggle (1931)
 M (1931)
 The Threepenny Opera (1931)
 Abraham Lincoln (1930)
 Spite Marriage (1929)
 Diary of a Lost Girl (1929)
 The Cameraman (1928)
 Steamboat Bill, Jr. (1928)
 Metropolis (1927)
 The General (1926)
 Faust (1926)
 Seven Chances (1925)
 The Navigator (1924)
 Sherlock Jr. (1924)
 The Last Laugh (1924)
 The Hands of Orlac (1924)
 The Thief of Bagdad (1924)
 The Finances of the Grand Duke (1924)
 Our Hospitality (1923)
 Three Ages (1923)
 Nosferatu (1922)
 The Haunted Castle (1921)
 The Cabinet of Dr. Caligari (1920)
 Intolerance (1916)
 The Birth of a Nation (1915)
 Cabiria (1914)

References

External links 
 

Film distributors of the United States
Film companies
Companies established in 1977